Vallecito Union School District is a unified school district located in Avery, California, a town located in Calaveras County.  It operates three schools: Avery Middle School, Albert Michelson Elementary, and Hazel Fischer Elementary.  The current superintendent is Dr. Rick Brewer.

References

External links
 

School districts in Calaveras County, California